John Edward Morgan (born 19 December 1977) is an English professional golfer. He has previously played on the PGA Tour, European Tour, and the Challenge Tour.

Career
After being largely overlooked as an amateur, Morgan turned professional in 2002, and won the Charles Church European Challenge Tour Championship on his way to graduating from the Challenge Tour to the European Tour. At the suggestion of his manager, Eddie Hearn, Morgan entered the PGA Tour qualifying school, and survived all three stages, finishing tied for 11th at the school finals to earn playing privileges in the United States. Morgan is only the second player to win full cards for both tours in his rookie season — the first was Richie Coughlan in 1997. Deciding to concentrate on the PGA Tour, Morgan lost a playoff to Mark Hensby at the John Deere Classic in 2004. This was Morgan's best PGA Tour result.

Morgan lost all playing privileges at the end of 2005, and returned to the Challenge Tour. A 17th place finish on the 2008 money list earned him a return to the European Tour the following season, but he could not hold on to his status, and returned once more to the Challenge Tour in 2010.

Professional wins (3)

Challenge Tour wins (1)

Challenge Tour playoff record (1–0)

PGA EuroPro Tour wins (2)

Playoff record
PGA Tour playoff record (0–1)

See also
2002 PGA Tour Qualifying School graduates
2008 Challenge Tour graduates

External links

English male golfers
European Tour golfers
PGA Tour golfers
Sportspeople from Bristol
1977 births
Living people